Elections to Runnymede Council were held on 4 May 2000. The whole council was up for election with boundary changes since the last election in 1999. The Conservative Party stayed in overall control of the council.

Election result

Ward results

References
2000 Runnymede election result
Ward results

2000
2000 English local elections
2000s in Surrey